Vizontele Tuuba is a 2004 Turkish comedy-drama film, written and directed by Yılmaz Erdoğan, based on the writer-director's childhood memories of the last summer of his childhood in village in 1980.

Production
The film was shot on location in Gevaş, Van Province and Ağrı Province, Turkey.

Synopsis
Five years after the events of the first film, Guner Sernikli is a government official who, with his wife Aysel and their wheelchair-bound daughter Tuba, has been assigned as the head librarian to Crazy Emin's village, even though there is no library. The family is welcomed by the Mayor and the other villagers while Emin becomes smitten with Tuba. However, they have to deal with the political violence engulfing the town's youth, which they resolve by setting up the library and digging up the TV set from the first film for visitors to use. After a few months of calm however, the 1980 Turkish coup d'état occurs, with Emin initially mistaking the announcement of the coup as a war movie. Soldiers arrive and arrest the town's men for alleged subversion but later release them all except for Guner and a few others. Guner's family moves out and Tuba shares a sorrowful parting with Emin.  

The story is based on the memories of writer-director Yılmaz Erdoğan of the last summer of his childhood in Hakkâri, Turkey in 1980.

Cast
 Yılmaz Erdoğan as Crazy Emin
 Tarık Akan as Güner Sernikli
 Altan Erkekli as Nazmi Doğan
 İclal Aydın as Ceyhan
 Demet Akbağ as Siti Ana
 Tuba Ünsal as Tuba Sernikli
 Tolga Çevik as Nafiz
 İdil Fırat as Aysel Sernikli

References

External links
 
 
 

2004 films
2000s Turkish-language films
2004 comedy-drama films
Films set in Turkey
Turkish comedy-drama films
Turkish sequel films
2004 comedy films
2004 drama films